Calalzo di Cadore is a municipality of 2,400 inhabitants of the province of Belluno, in the Italian region of Veneto. The name Calalzo derives from the Latin altus callis, meaning "high place." The geographical name "di Cadore" was added by Presidential Decree on 30 June 1959.

Geography 
Calalzo lies within the Cadore Dolomites. The Dolomites are a range of limestone mountains in northeastern Italy.

Transport 
Calalzo is the terminus of the Calalzo–Padua railway. From the station square, a bus service run by Dolomitibus serves Cortina d'Ampezzo, Auronzo, Santo Stefano di Comelico, and Sappada.

Sports

Cycling path 
Calalzo is home to a cycling path lying on the old railway line of Calalzo-Cortina, built in 1915 to move supplies during World War I. It became a tourist path in 1930 and was suppressed in 1967. Today it extends from Calalzo to Dobbiaco. During the year 2004 it was sealed and generally improved with better lighting in the tunnels.

Giro d'Italia 
The route of the 2013 Giro d'Italia passed through Calalzo di Cadore during Stage 11.

References

External links 

Municipalities of the Province of Belluno